The 1993 Nescafe Asian Open was a professional ranking snooker tournament that took place between 13–20 March 1993 at the Imperial Queens Park Hotel in Bangkok, Thailand.

Dave Harold won the tournament by defeating Darren Morgan 9–3 in the final. The defending champion Steve Davis was eliminated in the last 32 by Fergal O'Brien.


Main draw

References

1993 in snooker